Grady Cofer is an American visual effects artist. He was nominated for an Academy Award in the category Best Visual Effects for the film Ready Player One.

Selected filmography 
 Ready Player One (2018; co-nominated with Roger Guyett, Matthew E. Butler and Dave Shirk)

References

External links 

Living people
Place of birth missing (living people)
Year of birth missing (living people)
Visual effects artists
Visual effects supervisors